Leiosauridae is a family of iguanian lizards containing six genera and 34 species. The family is endemic to Central America and South America.

Taxonomy 
A 2022 phylogenetic study found the Leiosauridae to be the sister taxa to the Opluridae, a unique family of iguanians endemic to Madagascar, and one of only two pleurodont lineages found outside the Americas (the other being the genus Brachylophus). This called into question the previous hypothesis of Opluridae being the last members of an ancient lineage of Gondwanan iguanians, as the study found that the Leiosauridae and Opluridae only diverged during the Paleocene, about 60 million years ago. Opluridae are now thought to have colonized Madagascar via oceanic dispersal from South America, either directly or indirectly.

Genera
The family Leiosauridae contains the following genera:

References

Further reading
Frost, Darrel R.; Etheridge, Richard; Janies, Daniel; Titus, Tom A. (2001). "Total Evidence, Sequence Alignment, Evolution of Polychrotid Lizards, and a Reclassification of the Iguania (Squamata: Iguania)". American Museum Novitates (3343): 1-38. (Leiosauridae, new family, p. 12).

 
Lizard families
Taxa named by Darrel Frost
Taxa named by Richard Emmett Etheridge